The Copa Preparación 1960 was the 3rd edition of the Chilean Cup tournament. The competition started on March 26, 1960, and concluded on May 1, 1960. Deportes La Serena won the competition for the first time, beating Santiago Wanderers 4–1 in the final.

Matches were scheduled to be played at the stadium of the team named first on the date specified for each round. If scores were level after 90 minutes had been played, an extra time took place. If at the end of these 30 minutes Extra time periods, the teams have scored an equal number of goals, a coin toss took place.

Calendar

Group round

Group 1

Group 2

Group 3

Group 4

Group 5

Group 6

Group 7

Group 8

Group 9

Qualifying Playoff
Between winners groups 8 and 9

Quarterfinals

Semifinals

Final

Top goalscorers
 José Sulantay (D. La Serena) 7 goals,
 Juan Pinnola (D. La Serena) 7 goals

See also
 1960 Campeonato Nacional
 Primera B

References
Diario El Mercurio (Santiago, Chile) March, April, May 1960 (revised scores & information)
RSSSF (secondary source, many mistakes)

1960
Football competitions in Chile
Copa Chile
Chil